Nicolas Di Giugno (born 1 July 1988) is a Belgian football striker.

References
 Guardian Football

1988 births
Living people
Belgian footballers
R. Charleroi S.C. players
Place of birth missing (living people)

Association football forwards